Coleophora judaica is a moth of the family Coleophoridae. It is found in the Palestinian Territories.

References

judaica
Insects of the Middle East
Moths described in 1935
Moths of the Middle East